Luigi Samele (born 9 April 2002) is an Italian professional footballer who plays as a forward for  club Cerignola, on loan from Sassuolo.

Club career 
Luigi Samele made his professional debut for Monopoli on the 23 September 2020, replacing Álvaro Montero in a 1–0 Coppa Italia home win against Modena.
On 6 January 2022 he debuted in Serie A in 1-1 draw against Genoa.

In August 2022, Samele was loaned to Carrarese. On 20 January 2023, Samele moved on a new loan to Cerignola.

References

External links

2002 births
Footballers from Apulia
Living people
Italian footballers
Association football forwards
Sportspeople from Foggia
S.S. Monopoli 1966 players
U.S. Sassuolo Calcio players
Carrarese Calcio players
S.S.D. Audace Cerignola players
Serie A players
Serie C players